JMKO is the R&B, Soul, and Pop alias of Manila-born artist Jamiko Allan Sabbun Manguba (born 24 April 1994). JMKO is a Filipino musician signed as one of the newest singers of ABS-CBN Star Music. He was a former member of GMA Network's winning boy band Top One Project and made his debut as a singer with organizations in De La Salle University including De La Salle Innersoul and an a cappella group called "Taftonic." In 2015, Manguba auditioned for the reality show To The Top, and ended up being one of the grand winners that was later grouped together and became known as Top One Project.

On 13 December 2018, Manguba signed a contract as "JMKO" under GMA Records' rival record label, Star Music. Since then he has released singles on Spotify such as 'Isla' and 'Ano Nga Ba Tayo' which was used as part of the soundtrack for the iWant series 'Mga Batang Poz'.

Early life
Manguba was born in Manila, Philippines on 24 April 1994. He is the fourth of five children of Alexander Manguba and Marlan Manguba, both from Abulug, Cagayan Valley. His parents met in their hometown, and settled in Manila. Manguba attended primary and secondary school in Claret School of Quezon City and is currently studying AB Music Production in De La Salle–College of Saint Benilde.

Music career

De La Salle Innersoul (2012—2015) 

Manguba auditioned for the pop vocal group of De La Salle University Manila — De La Salle Innersoul as soon as he entered college. Since 2012, he had been performing in the group's annual concerts: Revolution (2012), Mga Awit ng Pagsinta (2013), All Souls (2014), and guest performed in Soul Adventures of the Piano Man: The Billy Joel Project (2015). In 2014, he was appointed as the Division Manager for Production and Logistics and in the following year, he wrote and produced the official anthem for the University's University Week 2015 called "One World, One La Salle" as the head of the Music Committee, along with his co-members from DLS Innersoul.

Manguba was also chosen to represent the Philippines in the ASEAN Jazz Festival which was held in Universiti Kebangsaan Malaysia, Kuala Lumpur, Malaysia in 2013 together with Jennifer Barican. He received the Gawad Raya Award under the Culture and Arts Office of DLSU in 2014 for being the 'Most Promising Performer in Solo Singing'. He is one of the distinguished alumni of De La Salle Innersoul.

To The Top (2015)

On 9 April 2015, Manguba auditioned for GMA Network's first reality boy band competition To The Top, along with hundreds of male singers from different school organizations. He was selected by a director from the network. Manguba stood as the leader for Team C and the new Team B, succeeding in five out of eight showdowns (Showdown 1: Boyband songs, Showdown 2: Family, Showdown 4: Fun, Showdown 6: OPM Love Songs, and Showdown 7: Ryan Cayabyab songs/TTT Originals) plus another win during the Composition Challenge ("Taksil Si Yaya"). Manguba was one of the five grand winners of the show in September 2015.

Top One Project

Following To The Top, Top One Project was signed under GMA Artist Center and GMA Records in 2015. Top One Project released their self-titled debut album digitally on 28 April 2016, with the songs in their first album including their original composition, "Sa'n Na", and carrier single, "Pag-gising."

Since joining TOP, Manguba, along with bandmates Mico Cruz, Joshua Jacobe, Adrian Pascual, and Louie Pedroso, has released the group's self-titled debut album in 2016.  In addition to singing, Manguba and Top One Project have appeared in television for various show guestings and minimal acting. He was signed under GMA Network and GMA Records.

Star Music – JMKO (2018—present) 

Manguba signs a recording contract as "JMKO" (pronounced Jamiko) with the rival label of GMA Records, Star Music on 13 December 2018 which officially announces the end of GMA Network's boyband group, Top One Project. Star Music has yet to reveal JMKO's future projects with ABS-CBN.

Some time around 2020 and 2021, he performed the local soundtrack of Story of Yanxi Palace entitled Aahon, and the Opening Theme song of Teleserye La Vida Lena, topbilled by Erich Gonzales.

Discography

Top One Project (2016)

Filmography

Songwriting/Music arrangement credits

See also
 To The Top (TV series)
 Top One Project (T.O.P.)

References

1994 births
Living people
21st-century Filipino male singers
Filipino pop musicians
Musicians from Metro Manila
Filipino songwriters
Participants in Philippine reality television series
GMA Network personalities
GMA Music artists
ABS-CBN personalities
Star Music artists